Best of Times is the third studio album released by the English band My Sad Captains on 17 March 2014 through Bella Union Records. The album was recorded in London and mixed by Larry Crane in Portland (OR). A single, 'Goodbye' was released on 29 January with a video directed by Dan Davis featuring Vincent Meehan (aka Lavinia Co-op).

Reception 

Best of Times received mixed reviews from critics. On Metacritic, the album holds a score of 65/100 based on 9 reviews, indicating "generally favorable reviews."

Track listing

References

2014 albums
My Sad Captains albums
Bella Union albums